Henry Gordon Mackenzie (July 9, 1937 – August 12, 2014) was an American professional baseball player, manager, coach and scout. He appeared in 11 Major League games played during the final weeks of the  season for the Kansas City Athletics, but collected only three singles and one base on balls in 25 plate appearances and never returned to the big leagues as a player.

Mackenzie signed with the Athletics after graduating from St. Petersburg High School. He made his MLB debut on August 13, 1961, as a pinch hitter against the Chicago White Sox, and was a starting catcher for five late-season games, but the 1961 audition provided Mackenzie's only big-league playing experience.

However, he would manage in minor league baseball for 16 years, and spend eight seasons as a coach at the Major League level for the Kansas City Royals (1980–81), Chicago Cubs (1982),  San Francisco Giants (1986–88) and Cleveland Indians (1991–92). He also scouted for the Los Angeles Dodgers and Washington Senators, and was an advance scout for the Indians and Houston Astros.

He won the Carolina League championship while managing the Kinston Indians in 1995. He was inducted in the Kinston Professional Baseball Hall of Fame in 2005.

References

External links

Gordon Mackenzie at Pura Pelota (Venezuelan Professional Baseball League)

1937 births
2014 deaths
Abilene Blue Sox players
Albany Senators players
Baseball players from St. Petersburg, Florida
Binghamton Triplets players
Birmingham Barons managers
Chicago Cubs coaches
Cleveland Indians coaches
Cleveland Indians scouts
Crowley Millers players
Geneva Senators players
Houston Astros scouts
Kansas City Athletics players
Kansas City Royals coaches
Lewiston Broncs players
Little Rock Travelers players
Los Angeles Dodgers scouts
Major League Baseball catchers
Major League Baseball first base coaches
Major League Baseball third base coaches
Nashville Sounds managers
Pocatello Bannocks players
Portland Beavers players
Rochester/Winona A's players
San Francisco Giants coaches
Shreveport Sports players
Sioux City Soos players
Spokane Indians players
Tiburones de La Guaira players
American expatriate baseball players in Venezuela
Washington Senators (1961–1971) scouts
St. Petersburg High School alumni